Henry Cravatte (born 21 May 1911 Diekirch; died 4 November 1990 Ettelbrück) was a Luxembourgish politician.

Political activity
Cravatte studied Jurisprudence and in 1936 became lawyer in Diekirch. His political career began in 1951 when he was placed on the list of the Workers' Party. He was elected to the local council and later as the mayor of Diekirch. From 1953 to 1957 he was a member of the Comité -director. In the period from 1958 to 1959 he was State Secretary of the economy. In 1959, Cravatte was elected to the Chamber of Deputies, the Luxembourg parliament. In 1964 he became Vice President of Government and Minister of Internal Affairs. After the founding of the Social Democratic Party, he resigned as president on 3 May 1970 and joined the newly formed party. From 1968 Cravatte was elected to the Chamber every five years until 1978.

Cravatte was Deputy Prime Minister from 1964 until 1969, and also served as President of the Luxembourg Socialist Workers' Party.

He was President of the Standing Conference of Local and Regional Authorities of Europe from 1962 to 1964 and again from 1976 to 1978.

On 14 March 1971 he became president of the Labor Party. He retained this post until 1980. On 4 November 1990 Henry Cravatte died at the age of 79 years in Ettelbrück.

Awards
 1962 - Decoration of Honour for Services to the Republic of Austria

|-

References

Deputy Prime Ministers of Luxembourg
Mayors of Diekirch
Councillors in Diekirch
Luxembourg Socialist Workers' Party politicians
Social Democratic Party (Luxembourg) politicians
1911 births
1990 deaths
People from Diekirch
20th-century Luxembourgian lawyers